The Chennai Egmore–Kanyakumari Express is a Superfast daily overnight train operated by Southern Railway zone of Indian Railways that runs between  and  in India. It is currently being operated with 12633/12634 train numbers on a daily basis.

Service 
This train runs between Kanyakumari and Chennai Egmore.
This is Overnight Superfast Express Train of Southern Railway. This is the fastest train to reach from state capital to kanyakumari.

Route 
This train runs through the chord line.

The important halts of the train are:
 -Source
 
 
 
 -Destination

Coach Composition
The train runs consists of 21 carriages:

It is running with brand new LHB Coaches

See also 
 Pearl City (Muthunagar) Superfast Express
 Nellai Superfast Express
 Chennai Egmore–Nagercoil Weekly Superfast Express
 Pandian Superfast Express
 Vaigai Superfast Express
 Pothigai Superfast Express

References

External links
Details of Kanyakumari Express on India Rail Info
12634/Kanniyakumari - Chennai Egmore Superfast Express India Rail Info

Transport in Kanyakumari
Transport in Chennai
Express trains in India
Rail transport in Tamil Nadu